Trenton Aerodrome  is a registered aerodrome located adjacent to Trenton, Nova Scotia, Canada. Since October 2006, the airport has been owned by Sobeys Incorporated.

History

1929–1939
The airport began in 1929 as a private operation by a group of local pilots. In June 1932 the  grass strip was officially opened with the landing of a de Havilland Gypsy Moth by Canadian aviation pioneer, Jimmy Wade. Later that year Jim Mollison, on his east to west crossing of the Atlantic Ocean landed at the airport, which was later named after him.

1939–1945

Aerodrome
The field was listed as "turf field" and had two runways listed as follows:

1945–present
In 1950, the airport left private ownership and became the property of the town of Trenton. In 2006, municipal officials felt "the town of about 2,700 could no longer afford to maintain the airport and its facilities." After searching for a buyer the only bidder was Sobeys Capital Incorporated, the airport's principal user.

Notable visitors to the airport include several prime ministers and other politicians as well as Babe Ruth, Bill Clinton, Queen Elizabeth and Prince Philip.

References

Registered aerodromes in Nova Scotia